Justine Henin-Hardenne defeated Kim Clijsters in the final, 6–0, 6–4 to win the women's singles tennis title at the 2003 French Open. It was her first major singles title, and she became the first Belgian to win a major; Clijsters (also Belgian) was attempting to achieve the same accolade. The final made Belgium the third country in the Open Era (following Australia and the United States) to have two countrywomen contest a major final.

Serena Williams was the defending champion, but was defeated by Henin-Hardenne in the semifinals, ending her winning streak of 33 major matches.

This marked the final major appearance of former world No. 1 and nine-time major champion Monica Seles, who was defeated by Nadia Petrova in the first round. This was Seles' only first-round loss at a major in her career. It was also the first French Open appearance for future world No. 1 and five-time major champion Maria Sharapova, who was defeated by Magüi Serna in the first round.

Seeds

Qualifying

Draw

Finals

Top half

Section 1

Section 2

Section 3

Section 4

Bottom half

Section 5

Section 6

Section 7

Section 8

External links
2003 French Open – Women's draws and results at the International Tennis Federation

Women's Singles
French Open by year – Women's singles
French Open - Women's Singles
French Open - Singles
French Open - Singles